Kierdeja - is a Polish coat of arms. It was used by several szlachta families in the times of the Polish–Lithuanian Commonwealth.

History

Blazon

Notable bearers
Notable bearers of this coat of arms include:
 General Eufemiusz Czaplic
 Jan Czaplic (Kiev castellan, d. 1604)
 Aleksander Czaplic-Szpanowski (Polish Arian connected with the Kisielin community (Volhynia), expelled from Poland in 1660, d. 1664)
 Józef Czaplic (Orthodox bishop of Lutsk, d. 1654)
 Celestyn Czaplic (Master of the Hunt of the Crown, Marshal of Polish Sejm, d. 1804)

See also
 Polish heraldry
 Heraldry
 Coat of arms

Polish coats of arms